Zapadnoye Lake is a lake about 0.5 miles (0.8 km) long situated near the western end of the Schirmacher Hills, Queen Maud Land. Mapped by the Soviet Antarctic Expedition in 1961 and named Ozero Zapadnoye (western lake).

References

Lakes of Queen Maud Land
Princess Astrid Coast
Lakes of Antarctica